Colonel Maharaja Raol Sir Shri Krishna Kumarsinhji Bhavsinhji KCSI (19 May 1912 – 2 April 1965) was an Indian king and politician, the last ruling Maharaja of the Gohil dynasty, who ruled Bhavnagar State from 1919 to 1948 and also served as the first Indian Governor of Madras from 1948 to 1952. After the handover of rule of the Bhavnagar State as part of the Indian Union, Bhavnagar became the first state which joined the Indian Union.

Early life
Krishna Kumarsinhji Bhavsinhji was born in Bhavnagar on 19 May 1912, the eldest son and heir of Maharaja Bhavsinhji II of Bhavnagar (1875–1919, r. 1896–1919). Kumarsinhji succeeded his father upon his death in 1919; only seven years old, he ascended the Bhavnagar throne under a regency until 1931. He was educated at Rajkumar College, Rajkot like his father and grandfather, who was the first student in 1870.

Reign
Kumarsinhji continued the progressive reforms of his father and grandfather, reforming the method of tax-collection in his state, introducing village councils and Bhavnagar's first legislature, the Dharasabha. Owing to his progressive reign, Kumarsinhji was knighted with the KCSI in 1938; however, he remained quietly committed to the cause of Indian independence. Therefore, upon Independence in 1947, Kumarsinhji became among the first of the Indian monarchs to accede to the Dominion of India in 1947. He merged Bhavnagar into the state of Kathiawad in 1948.

Maharaja Shri Bhavsinhji Polytechnic Institute was established by him in commemoration of his father Late Sir Bhavsinhji II in 1932, which commenced functioning in 1949.

Personal life
In 1931, Kumarsinhji married Maharani Shri Vijayabakunverba Sahiba (19 June 1910 – 6 October 1990), the daughter of Maharaja Bhojirajsinhji of Gondal and granddaughter of Maharaja Bhagvatsinh of Gondal. The couple had two sons and three daughters:
Maharaja Shri Virbhadra Sinh Gohil (14 March 1932 – 26 July 1994) who succeeded as Maharaja of Bhavnagar. His son, Vijayrajsinhji Gohil, is the present Maharaja of Bhavnagar
Maharajkumar Shivbhadra Sinh Gohel (b. 23 December 1933)
Maharajkumari Ba Shri Hansa Kunverba Sahiba (b. 25 July 1941) (now the Rajmata Sahiba of Ajaygarh)
Maharajkumari Ba Shri Dilhar Kunverba Sahiba (b. 19 November 1942) (now the Maharani Sahiba of Panna)
Maharajkumari Ba Shri Rohini Devi Sahiba (b. 8 October 1945) (now the Maharani of Kutch)

Later years
In 1948, he worked as acting Rajpramukh of United State of Kathiawar for a brief period. Later, in 1948, Kumarsinhji became the first Indian Governor of Madras, serving until 1952. Also, in that year Kumarsinhji was made an honorary Commodore in the Royal Indian Navy. From 1948 until 1952, Kumarsinhji also served as the President of the Shree Nandkunverba Kshatriya Kanya Vidhyalaya and as Vice-Patron of the United Service Institution of India. Krishna Kumarsinhji Bhavsinhji died at Bhavnagar on 2 April 1965, aged 52 after a reign of 46 years . He was succeeded as Maharaja of Bhavnagar by his eldest son, Virbhadrasinhji Krishna Kumarsinhji.

Titles
1912-1919: Maharajkumar Shri Krishna Kumarsinhji Bhavsinhji Sahib Gohil, Yuvraj Sahib of Bhavnagar
1919-1937: His Highness Maharaja Raol Shri Krishna Kumarsinhji Bhavsinhji Sahib, Maharaja of Bhavnagar
1937-1938: Lieutenant His Highness Maharaja Raol Shri Krishna Kumarsinhji Bhavsinhji Sahib, Maharaja of Bhavnagar
1938-1943: Lieutenant His Highness Maharaja Raol Shri Sir Krishna Kumarsinhji Bhavsinhji Sahib, Maharaja of Bhavnagar, KCSI
1943-1945: Captain His Highness Maharaja Raol Shri Sir Krishna Kumarsinhji Bhavsinhji Sahib, Maharaja of Bhavnagar, KCSI
1945-1946: Lieutenant-Colonel His Highness Maharaja Raol Shri Sir Krishna Kumarsinhji Bhavsinhji Sahib, Maharaja of Bhavnagar, KCSI
1946-1948: Colonel His Highness Maharaja Raol Shri Sir Krishna Kumarsinhji Bhavsinhji Sahib, Maharaja of Bhavnagar, KCSI
1948-1965: Commodore His Highness Maharaja Raol Shri Sir Krishna Kumarsinhji Bhavsinhji Sahib, Maharaja of Bhavnagar, KCSI
1948-1952: Commodore His Excellency Shri Sir Krishna Kumarsinhji Bhavsinhji Gohil, Governor of Madras State, KCSI

Honours

(ribbon bar, as it would look today)

Decorations and medals
King George V Silver Jubilee Medal-1935
King George VI Coronation Medal-1937
Knight Commander of the Order of the Star of India (KCSI)-1938
War Medal 1939-1945-1945
Defence Medal-1945
India Service Medal - 1945
Indian Independence Medal-1947

Hon. military ranks
Hon. Colonel, Indian Army - 18 January 1951
Hon. Commodore, Indian Navy - 18 January 1951

Political office

References

Governors of Tamil Nadu
Governors of Madras
1912 births
1965 deaths
20th-century Indian monarchs
Knights Commander of the Order of the Star of India
Indian knights
Gujarati people
Maharajas of Bhavnagar
Founders of Indian schools and colleges
Rajpramukhs
Saurashtra (state)